Acridocephala bistriata is a species of beetle in the family Cerambycidae. It was described by Chevrolat in 1855. It is known from the Democratic Republic of the Congo, Cameroon, and Nigeria.

References

bistriata
Beetles described in 1855